Tomáš Košút (born 13 January 1990) is a Slovak footballer who plays for Czech club FC Slavoj Vyšehrad as a centre back.

Club career
In June 2017, Košút signed for Polish side Arka Gdynia.

Honours 
Spartak Trnava
 Slovak Cup: 2018–19

References

External links
FC Slovácko profile 

1990 births
Living people
Sportspeople from Piešťany
Slovak footballers
Slovak expatriate footballers
Association football defenders
FC Nitra players
AC Sparta Prague players
1. FC Slovácko players
Arka Gdynia players
Budapest Honvéd FC players
FC Vereya players
FC Spartak Trnava players
FK Senica players
UD San Sebastián de los Reyes players
Slovak Super Liga players
Czech First League players
Czech National Football League players
Segunda División B players
Nemzeti Bajnokság I players
First Professional Football League (Bulgaria) players
Expatriate footballers in the Czech Republic
Expatriate footballers in Poland
Expatriate footballers in Hungary
Expatriate footballers in Bulgaria
Expatriate footballers in Spain
Slovak expatriate sportspeople in Hungary
Slovak expatriate sportspeople in the Czech Republic
Slovak expatriate sportspeople in Poland
Slovak expatriate sportspeople in Bulgaria
Slovak expatriate sportspeople in Spain